Christopher Nahi (born 11 September 1973) is a former professional rugby league footballer. He has played representative rugby league for both the New Zealand Māori team and the Rest of the World side.

Playing career
Nahi played for the Federal United club in the Northern Territory Rugby League competition. In 1994 Nahi toured Queensland and New South Wales with the Northern Territory Representative side.

Between 1996 and 1998 he played for the Gold Coast Chargers team, playing in 46 first grade matches. In 1997 he was cited for biting Darren Senter in a match against Balmain. Nahi alleged he was racially abused by Senter. It was during this time that he was selected in the Rest of the World team to play Australia during the Super League war.

In 2001 he played for the Eastern Suburbs Tigers in the Queensland Cup. In 2002 and 2003 he played for the Burleigh Bears.

In 2008 Nahi played for the Currumbin Eagles in the Bycroft Cup competition on the Gold Coast. After playing in the grand final he tested positive for D-Amphetamine and D-Methamphetamine. As a result, he was banned by the Queensland Rugby League until 1 October 2010.

Representative career
After touring Papua New Guinea with the team in 1998, Nahi was selected to be part of the Aotearoa Māori side that played in the 2000 World Cup. He also played for New Zealand Māori in 2002 against Tonga.

Controversy
Nahi was involved in a police raid which uncovered over 1000 ecstasy tablets in 2005, during the raid Nahi fled and remained on the run for eight days before his arrest. He was charged with "deprivation of liberty, the unlawful use of a motor vehicle, obstructing police, firearm and drug related offences". Nahi was sentenced to three-and-a-half years in jail for possessing a commercial quantity of ecstasy tablets in 2006 and convicted of the "deprivation of liberty" charge.

Nahi was released from jail in September 2008.

References

1973 births
Living people
New Zealand rugby league players
New Zealand Māori rugby league players
New Zealand Māori rugby league team players
Gold Coast Chargers players
Burleigh Bears players
Eastern Suburbs Tigers players
New Zealand criminals
Prisoners and detainees of Queensland
Rugby league second-rows
Rugby league props
People convicted of drug offenses
Sportspeople convicted of crimes